Christopher Andrew Celiz (January 12, 1986 – July 12, 2018) was a Sergeant first class in the United States Army. He was posthumously awarded the Medal of Honor by President Joe Biden on December 16, 2021, for his actions on July 12, 2018. 
President Biden awarded the Medal of Honor to Celiz's family during a ceremony on 16 December 2021, along with Earl Plumlee and the family of Alwyn Cashe. He was the first Jewish recipient of the Medal of Honor in the Global War on Terrorism.

A native of Summerville, South Carolina, Celiz attended The Citadel from 2004 to 2006. He enlisted in the Army in 2007.

Death
On July 12, 2018, as the leader of a special operations unit composed of partnered forces and members of the 1st Battalion, 75th Ranger Regiment, Celiz led an operation to clear an area of enemy forces and thereby disrupt future attacks against the government of the Islamic Republic of Afghanistan.

Shortly after his team reached their initial objective, a large enemy force attacked. The enemy placed effective fire on him and his team, preventing them from maneuvering to a counterattack. Realizing the danger to his team and the operation, Celiz voluntarily exposed himself to intense enemy machine-gun and small-arms fire.

Under fire, he retrieved and employed a heavy weapon system, thereby allowing U.S. and partnered forces to regain the initiative, maneuver to a secure location, and begin treating a critically wounded partnered force member.

As the medical evacuation helicopter arrived, it was immediately engaged by accurate and sustained enemy fire. Knowing how critical it was to quickly load the wounded partner, Celiz willingly exposed himself again to heavy enemy fire so he could take charge to direct and lead the evacuation. As the casualty was moved from a position of cover, Celiz made a conscious effort to ensure his body acted as a physical shield to protect his team, the injured partner and the crew of the aircraft from enemy fire. After the wounded partner was loaded, Celiz's team returned to cover, but he remained with the aircraft, returning a high volume of fire and constantly repositioning himself to act as a physical shield to the aircraft and its crew.

With his final reposition, Celiz placed himself directly between the cockpit and the enemy, ensuring the aircraft was able to depart. Upon the helicopter’s liftoff, Celiz was hit by enemy fire. Fully aware of his injury, but understanding the peril to the aircraft, Celiz motioned to Captain Ben Krzeczowski to depart rather than remain to load him. His selfless actions saved the life of the evacuated partnered force member and almost certainly prevented further casualties among other members of his team and the aircrew. Celiz died as a result of his injuries.

Medal of Honor citation

Awards and decorations

SFC Celiz received the following for his military career:

See also
 List of post-Vietnam Medal of Honor recipients

References

External links 

1986 births
2018 deaths
Military personnel from South Carolina
People from Summerville, South Carolina
United States Army Medal of Honor recipients
United States Army non-commissioned officers
American military personnel killed in the War in Afghanistan (2001–2021)
United States Army personnel of the War in Afghanistan (2001–2021)
Jewish Medal of Honor recipients